Duingt is a commune in the Haute-Savoie department in the Auvergne-Rhône-Alpes region in south-eastern France.

The history of the place starts in the Bronze Age (from 1400 to 700 BC) where the first habitats for human settlements were evolved. It was in this epoch where the hallmark of Duingt, the island called the island of Roselet, has been evolved from the lake. The first prehistoric objects such as pieces made of ceramic, bracelets and rings which are exhibited at the museum of Annecy have been found in 1856. Further pieces which relate to prehistoric settlement have been exposed in 1860.

Sights
The church of Duingt was built in the 19th century in Neo-Gothic style. Duingt has two castles, but they can not be visited. The Château de Duingt (other names: Château de Châteauvieux or C. de Ruphy) is located on a small island connected by a causeway to the mainland. The original castle was built in the 11th century and got its present shape between the 17th and 19th centuries. The Château d'Héré, built in the 15th century, can be found in Dhéré. In the center of Duingt there are still a number of houses in the typical Savoyard style of the 17th and 18th centuries.

See also
Communes of the Haute-Savoie department

References

External links

Communes of Haute-Savoie